Cendrowski is a surname. Notable people with the surname include:

Mariusz Cendrowski (born 1977), Polish boxer
Mark Cendrowski (born 1959), American television director